Saud Bahwan (Mohammed Saud Bahwan) (born 1938/39) is an Omani billionaire businessman.

Early life and career 
Bahwan began as a small-scale trader in Sur, with one dhow, inherited from his father, doing business between Oman and India. In 1965, he moved to the capital, Muscat and opened a shop in the Muttrah Souq with his brother Saud, named Suhail & Saud Bahwan, initially they traded in construction equipment and fishing nets.

In 1968, he obtained the local license for Seiko, and then one for Toyota.

The Saud Bahwan Group is now the largest privately owned business in Oman, with diverse business interests including fertilizers, healthcare, construction and automobiles.

In 2002, he split with his brother, and as a result, the Saud Bahwan was divided into two groups.

In 2016, Bahwan passed much of the responsibility for running the Saud Bahwan Group to Mohammed Nasser, his sixth child, and Amal Bahwan, his second-eldest daughter. In 2021, he was the only Omani on Forbes' annual World's Billionaires ranking.

During April 2022, the French prosecutor's office in Nanterre issued an international arrest warrant for Bahwan, along with former Renault CEO, Carlos Ghosn following an investigation into whether they helped divert funds from carmaker Renault to its former chair and chief executive for personal use. In 2022, his fortune supposedly dropped by $600 million.

Awards 

 2017: Sheikh Issa bin Ali al Khalifa Award for voluntary work by the Arab League

Personal life 
Bahwan is married with 15 children, and lives in Muscat, Oman.

References

1930s births
Living people
People from Sur, Oman
Omani billionaires
Omani businesspeople
Omani company founders